Rhyacichthys guilberti is a goby belonging to the family Rhyacichthyidae. This fish only occurs in the Northern Province of New Caledonia and in Vanuatu. It is found in only two rivers. Its maximum standard length of about 240 mm. Its population on New Caledonia was estimated at less than 400 individuals, but it is now thought to have been extirpated from that island, it remains common on Vanuatu.

Rhyacichthys guilberti occurs in coastal streams with a relatively steep gradient set in hilly or mountainous terrain. It feeds on algae and diatoms on rocks and stones. holding on in the fast current using its broadened pelvic and pectoral fins and its compressed head and snout.

The specific name honours the French entomologist Eric Guilbert who was involved in collecting the type specimen.

References

Rhyacichthyidae
Fish described in 1992
Fish of New Caledonia